Sallisaw Municipal Airport  is a city-owned, public-use airport located one nautical mile (2 km) southwest of the central business district of Sallisaw, a city in Sequoyah County, Oklahoma, United States. It is included in the National Plan of Integrated Airport Systems for 2011–2015, which categorized it as a general aviation facility.

Although most U.S. airports use the same three-letter location identifier for the FAA and IATA, this airport is assigned JSV by the FAA, but has no designation from the IATA.

Facilities and aircraft 
Sallisaw Municipal Airport covers an area of 171 acres (69 ha) at an elevation of 527 feet (161 m) above mean sea level. It has one runway designated 17/35 with an asphalt surface measuring 4,006 by 75 feet (1,221 x 23 m).

For the 12-month period ending September 21, 2011, the airport had 1,800 aircraft operations, an average of 150 per month: 94% general aviation and 6% military. At that time there were 17 aircraft based at this airport: 82% single-engine and 18% multi-engine.

References

External links 
 Airport page at City of Sallisaw website
 Sallisaw Municipal Airport (JSV) at Oklahoma Aeronautics Commission
 Aerial image as of March 1995 from USGS The National Map
 

Airports in Oklahoma
Buildings and structures in Sequoyah County, Oklahoma